Bhole may refer to:

 One of the names of Lord Shiva.
 Bhole (Cthulhu mythos), massive fictional creatures of the Dreamlands in the Dream cycle of H. P. Lovecraft
 Jyotsna Keshav Bhole (1914–2001), Marathi stage artist and singer
 Keshav Vaman Bhole (1896–1967), Indian music composer and film critic
 Suresh Damu Bhole, Indian politician, member of the 13th Maharashtra Legislative Assembly
 Bhole, character from the 2008 Indian film Bhole Shankar

See also 
 Bohle, a German surname